Barbara Chilcott Davis (September 10, 1922 – January 1, 2022) was a Canadian actress.

Career
After the war she studied at the Central School of Speech and Drama in London, making her West End debut in 1949. On her return to Canada in 1950, she soon became one of the country's leading actresses. In 1953, with her brothers Murray and Donald Davis, she founded the Crest Theatre in Toronto, which operated until 1966.

Chilcott died in Toronto on January 1, 2022, at the age of 99.

Partial filmography
 1960 The Full Treatment as Baroness de la Vailion
 1966 The Trap as Trader's Wife
 1975 Lies My Father Told Me as Mrs. Tannenbaum
 1993 M. Butterfly as Critic at Garden Party
 1996 No Contest II as Mrs. Holman

References

External links
 
 Entry at thecanadianencyclopedia.ca
 Archives of Barbara Chilcott (Barbara Chilcott fonds, R11210) are held at Library and Archives Canada 

1922 births
2022 deaths
Actresses from Toronto
Canadian film actresses
Canadian television actresses
Canadian stage actresses
20th-century Canadian actresses
Alumni of the Royal Central School of Speech and Drama